Desmiphora obliquelineata is a species of beetle in the family Cerambycidae. It was described by Breuning in 1948. It is known from Brazil.

References

Desmiphora
Beetles described in 1948